Malinovka is a rural locality (a settlement) in Obozerskoye Urban Settlement of Plesetsky District, Arkhangelsk Oblast, Russia. The population was 122 as of 2010. There are 2 streets.

Geography 
Malinovka is located 73 km north of Plesetsk (the district's administrative centre) by road. Sosnovka is the nearest rural locality.

References 

Rural localities in Plesetsky District